Jeremy John Christie (born 22 May 1983) is a New Zealand international footballer who most recently played for FC Tampa Bay in the North American Soccer League.

Christie specialises in central midfield and as a defender. Christie was part of the selected All Whites squad which competed at the 2010 FIFA World Cup.

Career

Club
Christie has played for a number of teams since making his professional debut in 1999. He has played with Barnsley FC, Football Kingz, New Zealand Knights, Perth Glory and Wellington Phoenix.

Christie signed with A-league expansion club Wellington Phoenix from Perth Glory for the start of the 2007–08 season and joined up with fellow All Whites Shane Smeltz, Glen Moss, Tim Brown and Mark Paston. He made 27 appearances in two seasons with the Phoenix before leaving at the conclusion of the 2008–09 season.

Christie then went in search of regular playing time to boost his All Whites selection chances for the 2010 FIFA World Cup and signed with FC Tampa Bay of the North American Soccer League on 21 January 2010. Christie made his first team debut in their opening match of the 2010 season – a 1–0 home win over Crystal Palace Baltimore F.C. in which he provided the game-winning goal assist.

Christie scored his first goal for Tampa Bay in a 2–2 draw with Austin Aztex FC, an 86th minute penalty kick to tie the game in front of a sell-out home crowd.

Christie missed most of the 2011 season for FC Tampa Bay due to hip surgery he had undertaken during the off season. At the conclusion of the 2011 season Christie left FC Tampa Bay. Christie played in the ASB Premiership in New Zealand's top flight competition for Waitakere United in at least two separate spells from 2004 onwards.

International
Christie was selected to captain the New Zealand U-17 squad for the 1999 FIFA U-17 World Cup which was hosted by New Zealand and played in all three group stage matches against Poland, Uruguay and the United States. Christie has also earned national representation at U-20 and U-23 level between 2001 and 2005.

Christie made his All Whites senior debut with a substitute appearance in a 0–1 loss to Australia on 9 June 2005 at Craven Cottage. He was named as part of the 2009 FIFA Confederations Cup New Zealand squad to travel to South Africa, playing in all three pool matches against Spain, South Africa and Iraq.

On 10 May 2010, Christie was named in New Zealand's final 23-man squad to compete at the 2010 FIFA World Cup. and appeared as a second-half substitute in New Zealand's first two games which both resulted in 1–1 draws with Slovakia and 2006 World Champions Italy.

Career statistics

International

International goals

See also
 List of New Zealand international footballers
 List of New Zealand Knights FC players
 List of Perth Glory FC players
 List of Wellington Phoenix FC players

References

External links

1983 births
Living people
Sportspeople from Whangārei
New Zealand association footballers
New Zealand international footballers
A-League Men players
National Soccer League (Australia) players
Barnsley F.C. players
Football Kingz F.C. players
Waitakere United players
New Zealand Knights FC players
Perth Glory FC players
Wellington Phoenix FC players
Tampa Bay Rowdies players
Expatriate soccer players in the United States
New Zealand expatriate sportspeople in England
USSF Division 2 Professional League players
North American Soccer League players
New Zealand Māori sportspeople
Association football midfielders
2008 OFC Nations Cup players
2009 FIFA Confederations Cup players
2010 FIFA World Cup players